Seidel may refer to:

Seidel (surname)
Seidel (crater), on the Moon
Seidel Band Instrument Company, a short-lived American company
Seidel Creek, a stream in Pennsylvania